Tammistu may refer to several places in Estonia:

Tammistu, Harju County, village in Kuusalu Parish, Harju County
Tammistu, Hiiu County, village in Hiiu Parish, Hiiu County
Tammistu, Tartu County, village in Tartu Parish, Tartu County